Chand Sadagar (Assamese: চান্দ  সদাগৰ, Bengali: চাঁদ সদাগর) was a rich and powerful  sea merchant of Champaknagar in Eastern India. This merchant has been claimed by both the Assamese and  Bengali people of India to be associated with their respective states and communities. Medieval Bengali poet Bipradas Pipilai mentioned in his "Manasamangal Kāvya" (or "Manasa Vijay") that merchant ship of Chand Sadagar used to proceed to the sea from ancient Champaknagar of Kamarupa after passing through Tribeni, situated at the junction of Saptagram and the confluence of Ganges, Saraswati and Jamuna River of modern-day West Bengal. Narayan Dev in the Assamese scriptures gave an account in his Manasamangal about the merchant ship of the trader Chand Saudagar proceeding to the sea from ancient Champaknagar of Assam passing through Saptagram and Tribeni, the tri-junction of the Ganges, Saraswati and Jamuna River. In the Padmapuran (Hindu Sptures), account of Chand Bania (Sadagar) is specifically mentioned.

Chand Sadagar, (Assamese: চান্দ  সদাগৰ) who was a Merchant ("Bania" in Assamese) is believed to be the ancient descendant of the ethnic Bania community of Assam. He was a rich and powerful river and sea merchant of Champaknagar, Kamarupa who lived between 200 and 300 AD. Narayan Dev gave an account in his Manasamangal about the merchant ship of the trader Chand Saudagar proceeding to the sea from ancient Champaknagar of Assam passing through Saptagram and Tribeni, the tri-junction of the Ganges, Saraswati and Jamuna River.

In the Padmapuran, account of Chand Bania is specifically mentioned. Narayan Dev also have mentioned in Padmapuran about the father of Behula who was called as Sahe Bania. Sahe Bania established his kingdom at Udalguri/Tangla area of the old Kamarupa.Further, it has been established in the history book "Mangaldai Buranji" by the historian Dineswar Sarma that Chand Sadagar belonged to ancient Bania community whose predecessors are represented by the Assamese Bania community today. These people later got scattered all over Brahmaputra valley. However, people with direct lineage of Chand Sadagar are still there in Udalguri and Tangla district of Assam.

The ruins and statue of Chand Sadagar are found in Chhaygaon Area of Assam. It is proved genuine by the Archaeological Department of India. Moreover, Champaknagar is still found in Chaigaon of Kamarupa.

Champaknagar

Champaknagar of Chand Sadagar has been claimed by both the Bengali and Assamese people of India to be situated in their respective states. The original is at Champak Nagar in Chaygaon, Assam.

Bengali Version 
According to the local folklore of West Bengal Champainagari, or Kasba-Champainagari, situated in the Purba Bardhaman district of West Bengal is the Champak Nagar of Chand Sadagar. The locals believe that the place is associated with Ma Manasa and Chand Sadagar. In "Ain-i-Akbari" also the name of Champainagari Pargana under Sarkar Madaran has been mentioned, which was located in the present Purba Bardhaman district of West Bengal. Kasba-Champainagari is located on the north bank of Damodar River, approx. 32 miles west of Bardhaman city and south of Budbud. We know from the story of Manasamangal that Chand Sadagar was a staunch Shaivite and he even built a Shiva temple in his house. According to the local folklore of this village, the two Shivalingas (one of which is Rameshwar Shivalinga) resting in two ancient Shiva Temples situated in this village of Purba Bardhaman were established by Chand Sadagar himself. There is a beautiful Shiva temple on a high mound situated to the south of the DVC canal. The Shiva temple, located next to a huge Ashwattha tree, has a huge Shivalinga (without the Gauri Patta), known as Rameshwar Shivalinga. There are also two high mounds in the village, one of which is believed to be the ruins of Behula's Basarghar (Sati-Tirtha) and Chand Sadagar's house.

Sundarban Tiger Reserve of West Bengal, is associated as the place where Neti, foster mother of Ma Manasha, lived and worked as a washerwoman. A temple at Howrah, a Kolkata neighborhood, is believed to have been built by Chand Sadagar.

Between the citadel and the eastern embankment at Gaur, a ruined structure, is claimed to be the house of Chand Sadagar.

Assamese Version 
According to Assamese folklore, Champaknagar is placed in Chaygaon, Kamrup, about 30-40 km from Guwahati, Assam. Champaknagar is still there in Chaigaon area of Kamarupa in Assam. To escape from the plight of Ma Manasa, Lakhindhar and Behula escaped to a place called Gokul Medh, 3 km south of Mahasthangarh and 9 km north of Bogra town, 1 km from the Bogra-Rangpur road of modern Bangladesh after Behula's Basarghar or Lakhinder's Medh. During excavations here in 1934–36, 162 rectangular abattoirs were found in a lined courtyard. It was built in the sixth or seventh century AD. According to local folklore, this place is associated with Behula and Lakhinder. The remains of a temple have been found 800 meters west of the north-west corner of the ruins at Chengispur village in Mahasthangarh. It is called Khullana mound. The Karatoya River, which flows through the region, is now narrow but is known to have been huge in the past. 
There is a region in Dhubri district of Assam, much north of Bogra. The area is believed to be reminiscent of Mansa's companion leader.

In popular culture
In 1927, Manmatha Roy wrote the mythological Bengali play Chand Saudagar, portraying the title character.

In 1934, Prafulla Roy directed a Bengali film Chand Saudagar in which Dhiraj Bhattacharya played the role of Lakshmindara, Ahindra Choudhury that of Chand Sadagar, Devbala of Manasa, Sefalika Devi of Behula, Jahar Ganguli of Kalu Sardar, Indubala of a singer, Niharbala of Neta Dhobani, Padmabati of Sanaka and Usharani of Amala. It was written by Manmatha Roy. Film editing was by Akhil Neogi.

In 2010, STAR Jalsha create a Bengali serial "Behula".

Amitav Ghosh's novel Gun Island deals with Chand Sadagar.

2022 Bangladeshi film Hawa is loosely based on this myth.

References

Assamese folklore
200 births
Indian explorers